Jokosher is a free software, non-linear multi-track digital audio editor, released under the GPL-2.0-only. It is written in Python, using the GTK+ interface and GStreamer as an audio back-end, initially just for the Linux operating system but also with support for Windows.

It was released to the public on 21 July 2006. Version 0.2 was publicly released on 20 November 2006 and it included support for extensions, LADSPA effects, and many bug fixes. Development on the project stopped in April 2012, and the project is no longer active.

Background
At the beginning of 2006, Jono Bacon was dissatisfied with the available free and open source Linux multi-track editors, and used Cubase instead to produce LugRadio, a Linux fortnightly podcast. He later on conceived the idea of what initially was Jonoedit. The name Jokosher came later, a pun on the fact that his name contains the phrase "no bacon". The aim was to create an open source multi-track editor that was easy to use, so the user did not require an understanding of multi-track recording.

Using LugRadio, his blog and the various planet aggregators connected to it, a community came together to form the Jokosher art, coding, documentation, and packaging teams working on the project.

Features

Ease of use
The interface aims to use concepts familiar with the artists and musicians that use the program. This means that the user doesn't require great deal of familiarity with multi-track editors to be able to record.

Editing and mixing
Jokosher includes tools for splitting, trimming and moving, when editing. During the mixing, multi-track volume is available with VU sliders. Audio-tracks are called "instruments" in Jokosher. A range of instruments can be added to a project, and instruments can be renamed. Instruments can also be muted and soloed easily.

Audio
Jokosher can import audio from Ogg Vorbis, MP3, FLAC, WAV and anything else supported by GStreamer into projects. After recording, it can export back to any of these formats.

GStreamer
Jokosher needs either the latest version of GStreamer and Gnonlin installed, or a Concurrent Versions System (CVS) checkout of GStreamer and Gnonlin compiled. This is because the newer versions of Gstreamer have features of which Jokosher is taking advantage. It also introduces many bug fixes that previously were blocking Jokosher from any kind of release. The Jokosher development team contributed greatly to the GStreamer development.

See also 

Comparison of free software for audio
Linux audio software
Multitrack recording

References

External links

Free music software
Free audio software
Audio editing software that uses GTK
Free software programmed in Python
Free audio editors
Software that uses PyGTK
Software that uses GStreamer
Digital audio editors for Linux